The Studio Building (1861–1906) on Tremont Street (corner of Bromfield Street) in Boston, Massachusetts, housed artists' studios, theater companies and other businesses in the 19th century. It "held the true Bohemia of Boston, where artists and literati delighted to gather." Among the tenants were portraitist E.T. Billings, architect George Snell, sculptor Martin Milmore, artists William Morris Hunt, William Rimmer, Edward Mitchell Bannister, Phoebe Jenks; gallerist Seth Morton Vose, and many others.

History

Artists' studios
From 1861 the Studio Building stood adjacent to the Horticultural Hall, on the opposite side of Bromfield St. The building consisted of "a massive range of brick, four stories high, — the whole surmounted by a French roof; a handsome and imposing structure, in the lower story of which are six fine large stores, occupied [in 1869] by the Leavitt and Parker Sewing-Machine Cos., California Wine Agency, the Howard Clock Co., &c.; and, above-stairs, by numerous artists, painters, engravers, draughtsmen, &c."

"The Studio Building ... is a perfect hive of artists. This building, indeed, is the headquarters of the artists of Boston. ... There are delightful artists' receptions here, to which the general public is invited. Besides the devotees of art, there are many private teachers of music and the languages in the Studio Building, and not a few of the rooms are occupied as bachelors' apartments." Visitors included Sophia Peabody Hawthorne in 1863: "5 June, Thursday. Finest day - cool. We went out after breakfast with Annie. We visited Studio gallery - & saw good statue of Judge Shaw. Hunt's portrait by himself. Healy's Longfellow. Ames' Rachel. Gay's seashore & a pearly silvery sky of wondrous truth."

Beginning in November 1861, artist William Rimmer gave anatomy "lectures in Room 55 of the Studio Building. He was an inspiring teacher; John LaFarge ... Daniel Chester French, Frederick Vinton, Frank Benson and many others testified to it. ... He represented the first thorough art instruction based on the human figure to be given in Boston, and indeed in the entire United States. ... Rimmer's lectures were never mere dry analyses of muscles and their attachments. He drew brilliantly on the blackboard, combining technical diagrams with fantastic embellishments. His figures sprouted wings, were set off by elegant draperies, sat beside elaborate urns, were clad in fanciful armor, brandished trumpets and daggers." One of his students was May Alcott, who "studied sculpture with William Rimmer and painting with William Hunt at the new Studio Building in Boston, on the corner of Tremont and Broomfield streets."

The "studio and gallery" of William Morris Hunt "were the great attractions to visitors who came to the 'receptions' given by the artists in the building. The stirring picture, The Bugle Call, painted in Newport, was exhibited here; the drawing of The Drummer Boy, which attracted great crowds while on exhibition in Messrs. Williams & Everett's window, was conceived and executed here. Its motto, 'To arms! To arms!' found a response in the mood of the citizens, who were burning with patriotic ardor. I think this was just after the firing upon Fort Sumter, in 1861." According to one historian, however, Hunt himself probably found Boston "a far cry from the carefree vie de Boheme of Paris, and the life centering around the Studio Building on Tremont Street but a pale replica of the Latin Quarter -like a plaster cast, almost like a death mask, one might say, of the lively original."

Tremont Theatre
"The new Tremont Theatre, in the Studio Building, on Tremont street, was remodelled from Allston Hall, and opened as a theatre on Feb. 9, 1863, under the management of Mrs. Jane English, with a ballet and pantomime troupe. ... For a brief period K. L. Davenport and J. W. Wallack were managers of the house, but notwithstanding the high character of the dramatic work done here, it was not a prosperous theatre. It was finally converted into a hall for pedestrian matches, and [by 1892 was] used for a retail carpet-store."

Performances included:
 "Le Rue's great war show! The wonderful strato-pateticon, or walking-army"
 Theatre Francais, directed by Paul Juignet, 1864-1865
 Tom Taylor's The Ticket-of-Leave Man, 1865
 Holman Opera Troupe -Mr. George Holman, his wife, his daughter Sallie Holman (soprano/principal singer) and another daughter, and two sons, with some others, including William H. Crane and Sallie`s husband Mr. J. T. Dalton, which toured throughout Canada for many years.
 Morris Brothers, Pell & Trowbridge's Minstrels
 Cotton & Murphy Minstrels

Fire in 1906
In December 1906 a fire "caused heavy damage in the block bounded by Tremont, Bromfield, Washington and Winter streets. ... The flames were confined ... to one structure, the Studio building."

Images

Tenants

 American Art Gallery
 Joseph Ames
 Miss M.K. Baker, artist
 E.M. Bannister, artist
 E.T. Billings, artist
 Edward Brackett
 Miss M.A. Bradford, artist
 Mrs. E.H. Brainard, artist
 Miss H.L. Brown, artist
 J. Appleton Brown, artist
 E.C. Cabot, architect
 Edward G. Caldwell, architect
 Miss E.M. Carpenter, artist
 William Carl, artist
 Miss A.E. Chandler, artist
 F. Myron Clark
 J.G. Cloudman, artist
 George A. Clough, architect
 Darius Cobb, artist
 Theodore E. Colburn, architect
 Henry Cook, artist
 Charles Copeland, artist
 J.C. Crossman, artist
 George L. Crosby, artist
 Cummings & Sears, architects
 Cyrus E. Dallin, artist
 Thomas W. Dewing, artist
 T.C. Doane
 John Donoghue, artist
 Morris Dorr, architect
 Grace Dow, artist
 Frank Duveneck, artist
 B.F. Dwight, architect
 Educational Committee for Freedmen
 L.D. Eldred, artist
 William R. Emerson, architect
 Miss M.M. Emery, artist
 Fabronius, artist
 A.C. Fenety, artist
 F.M. Fenety, artist
 Beatrice V. Folsom, artist
 Bradford Freeman, artist
 Francis Seth Frost
 Edmund H. Garrett, artist
 Ignaz Gaugengigl, artist
 S.L. Gerry
 Ellen L. Gilbert, artist, educator
 James Gilbert, artist
 Abbott Graves
 James R. Gregerson, architect
 S.W. Griggs, artist
 Louis K. Harlow, artist
 George F. Higgins, artist
 S.P. Hodgdon, artist
 Mrs. Horton, artist
 William Morris Hunt
 Phoebe A. Jenks, artist
 N.T. Johnson, artist
 D.C. Johnston and T.M.J. Johnston, artists
 Earnest Kuhn, artist
 Walter F. Lansil, artist
 A.W. Latham, artist
 Edmonia Lewis
 L.K. Long, artist
 W.P.P. Longfellow, architect
 G.A. Loring, artist
 Miss E.P. Mann, artist
 Marshall & Co., photographs
 Mrs. M.C. McGurk, artist
 H.W. Merrill, artist
 Samuel S. Miles, artist
 Martin Millmore, sculptor
 B.R. Morse, artist
 George C. Munzig, artist
 P. Nefflen, artist
 New England Loyal Publication Society (related to the Loyal Publication Society
 Jessie Noa, artist
 F. Evelyn Nute, artist
 Alfred Ordway, artist
 H. Winthrop Peirce, artist
 S.E. Perkins, artist
 Miss M.A. Platt, artist
 B.C. Porter, artist
 C.W. Reed, artist
 Miss H. Reed, artist
 Mrs. E.S. Remick, artist
 J.F. Reynolds
 William Rimmer, sculptor
 Thomas Robinson, artist
 S.W. Rowse, artist
 L.A. Schirmer, artist
 G.W. Seavey, artist
 Frank H. Shapleigh, artist
 Anna H. Silloway, artist
 T.S. Slafter, artist
 H.G. Smith, photographer, publisher
 George Snell, architect
 Miss Southwick, artist
 Charles E. Stetfield, artist
 Miss S.C. Stetson, artist
 Frederick T. Stuart, artist, c. 1902
 Miss F.W. Tewskbury, artist
 Jerome Thompson, painter
 John D. Towle & Son, architects
 Henry Van Brunt and William Robert Ware, architects
 Herman Vogel, artist
 Seth Morton Vose, gallerist
 Lilian Walker, artist
 Florence I. Webber, artist
 George A. Weeden, artist
 Fred D. Williams, artist
 Joseph P. Woodbury, "inventor"
 Elizabeth Wyer, artist

References

External links

 Flickr. Portrait of Theadoria Caffrain Homes, 1860s; by Marshall, photographer, Studio Building, Cor. Tremont & Bromfield Sts., Boston
 Historic New England. Drawing of Studio Building
 Boston Athenaeum. James Wells Champney's "Sketch from Studio Building, Boston, during fire. 4 o’clock morning Nov. 10th, 1872"
 Bostonian Society. Photo of Studio Building at 104-116 Tremont Street, 1905
 Boston Public Library. Photo, 1916

Commercial buildings completed in 1861
Former buildings and structures in Boston
Cultural history of Boston
19th century in Boston
Financial District, Boston
1861 establishments in Massachusetts